Anta Mantay (Quechua anta copper, mantay to spread out, also spelled Antamantay) is a mountain in the Andes of Peru which reaches an altitude of approximately . It is located in the Lima Region, Canta Province, Huaros District. Anta Machay lies northwest and west of a lake named Tuqtuqucha ("broody hen's lake", also named Mellizas de Tactococha or Mellizas de Tuctococha).

References

Mountains of Peru
Mountains of Lima Region